The 1985–86 Chicago Bulls season was the 20th season of the franchise in the National Basketball Association (NBA). During the offseason, they acquired forward Charles Oakley from the Cleveland Cavaliers, veteran guard George Gervin from the San Antonio Spurs and signed free agent guards Kyle Macy and John Paxson. The season was a near disaster as Michael Jordan was lost for much of the regular season due to a broken foot. Despite the injury to Jordan, the team managed to qualify for the NBA Playoffs.

Offseason

NBA Draft
The 1985 NBA Draft took place on June 18, 1985. It was also the first NBA Draft of the "Lottery" era. The lottery was put into place so teams did not have to intentionally lose games to receive the number one pick.

Roster

Regular season
 Michael Jordan's second season was cut short by a broken foot which caused him to miss 64 games. Despite Jordan's injury and a 30–52 record, the Bulls made the playoffs.
 C - Dave Corzine
 PF - Charles Oakley
 SF - Orlando Woolridge
 SG - Michael Jordan
 PG - Kyle Macy

Season standings

z - clinched division title
y - clinched division title
x - clinched playoff spot

Record vs. opponents

Player stats

Regular season

Playoffs

Playoffs
At the time, the Bulls had the fifth worst record of any team to qualify for the playoffs in NBA history.  Michael Jordan recovered in time to participate in the playoffs and performed well upon his return. Against a Boston Celtics team that is often considered one of the greatest in NBA history, Jordan set the still-unbroken record for points in a playoff game with 63 in game 2. The Celtics, however, managed to sweep the series.

|- align="center" bgcolor="#ffcccc"
| 1
| April 17
| @ Boston
| L 104–123
| Michael Jordan (49)
| Charles Oakley (10)
| Macy, Paxson (4)
| Boston Garden14,890
| 0–1
|- align="center" bgcolor="#ffcccc"
| 2
| April 20
| @ Boston
| L 131–135 (2OT)
| Michael Jordan (63)
| Charles Oakley (14)
| Michael Jordan (6)
| Boston Garden14,890
| 0–2
|- align="center" bgcolor="#ffcccc"
| 3
| April 22
| Boston
| L 104–122
| John Paxson (23)
| Dave Corzine (15)
| Michael Jordan (9)
| Chicago Stadium18,968
| 0–3
|-

Awards and honors
 Charles Oakley, NBA All-Rookie Team 1st Team
 Michael Jordan, NBA All-Star Game

References

 Bulls on Database Basketball
 Bulls on Basketball Reference

Chicago Bulls seasons
Chic
Chicago Bulls
Chicago Bulls